Togolese Red Cross was established in 1959. It has its headquarters in Lomé.

External links
Togolese Red Cross Profile
Official Red Cross Web Site 

Red Cross and Red Crescent national societies
1959 establishments in French Togoland
Organizations established in 1959
Medical and health organisations based in Togo